WQYK-FM (99.5 MHz, currently branded 99.5 QYK) is a commercial country music radio station in Tampa, Florida. It is under ownership of Beasley Broadcast Group.  Its studios are in St. Petersburg (city of license) while its transmitter is east of Palm River-Clair Mel.

History
It signed on the air in May 1958 as WTCX. WTCX was a 31,000-watt classical music station and the first Tampa Bay FM to introduce stereo sound. It originally broadcast from a tiny studio at the transmitter site at 5750 North Haines Road in St. Petersburg, Florida and was owned by Trans-Chord company. Today, the call sign belongs to a radio station in Wisconsin.

The call letters changed to the current WQYK-FM in 1972, and began its long running country format. Infinity Broadcasting would buy the station from Lake Huron Broadcasting in January 1987. Infinity would be renamed CBS Radio in December 2005.

On October 2, 2014, CBS Radio announced that it would trade all of their radio stations located in Charlotte and Tampa (including WQYK), as well as WIP in Philadelphia, to the Beasley Broadcast Group in exchange for 5 stations located in Miami and Philadelphia. The swap was completed on December 1, 2014. Shortly after the swap, the station branding was changed from "99.5 WQYK" to "99.5 QYK".

References

External links
WQYK Website

QYK-FM
Country radio stations in the United States
QYK-FM
1958 establishments in Florida
Radio stations established in 1958